William Chisholm Macdonald (6 May 1890 – 19 November 1946) was a Liberal party member of the House of Commons of Canada. He was born in Bailey's Brook, Nova Scotia and became a barrister by career.

He was first elected to Parliament at the Halifax riding in the 1940 general election and re-elected in 1945. Macdonald died on 19 November 1946 before completing his term in the 20th Canadian Parliament.

Electoral results

References

External links
 

1890 births
1946 deaths
Members of the House of Commons of Canada from Nova Scotia
Lawyers in Nova Scotia
Liberal Party of Canada MPs